Guskhara Airfield is a former wartime United States Army Air Forces airfield in India used during the Burma Campaign 1944-1945. It is now abandoned.

History
Guskhara was a photo-recon base for the Tenth Air Force during 1944–1945. Its primary tenants were the following units:
 8th Photographic Reconnaissance Group
 20th Tactical Reconnaissance Squadron 5 January-26 March 1944
 24th Combat Mapping Squadron 5 January 1944 - February 1945
 40th Photographic Reconnaissance Squadron 18 July-9 August 1944
 35th Photographic Reconnaissance Squadron (F-5/P-38) June 13, 1944 - September 1, 1944
 426th Night Fighter Squadron, January–August 1945 (P-61) (Detachment)
 2nd Weather Reconnaissance Squadron

References

 Maurer, Maurer. Air Force Combat Units Of World War II. Maxwell Air Force Base, Alabama: Office of Air Force History, 1983. 
  www.pacificwrecks.com - Guskhara keyword search

External links

Airfields of the United States Army Air Forces in British India
Defunct airports in India
Airports in West Bengal
Buildings and structures in Purba Bardhaman district
Airports established in 1944
1944 establishments in India
20th-century architecture in India